Tang Qingcai (born 26 March 1961) is a Chinese windsurfer. He competed in the Windglider event at the 1984 Summer Olympics.

References

External links
 

1961 births
Living people
Chinese male sailors (sport)
Chinese windsurfers
Olympic sailors of China
Sailors at the 1984 Summer Olympics – Windglider
Place of birth missing (living people)